Pol Maj Gen Vichai Sangprapai (also spelled Wichai Sangprapai; ; born: January 16, 1955) Thai politician, who is the former deputy chief of Metropolitan Police Bureau and chief of Metropolitan Police Division 1.

Biography & career
Sangprapai was born in a poor farmer family at Sena district, Phra Nakhon Si Ayutthaya province. He had a dream of wanting to be a soldier since childhood, but cannot enter the Armed Forces Academies Preparatory School, so he changed the way to become a police officer, starting from being a non-commissioned officer and was promoted to the rank of commissioner until finally.

He is widely known as chief of Metropolitan Police Division 1 and deputy chief of Metropolitan Police Bureau, by being a police buster. He earned the alias "Black-Eared Buster" (มือปราบหูดำ) owing to his left ear has a black birthmark, but the general people colloquially him as "Commander Taem" (ผู้การแต้ม) according to his nickname.

Later in the middle of 2012, he resigned from the police career. In early 2013, he was appointed as advisor to the Bangkok Governor MR Sukhumbhand Paribatra and resigned in early 2016 after conflicting opinions.

On November 26, 2018, he applied for membership of the Democrat Party and was elected to be a candidate for the House of Representatives Bangkok's 9nd constituency, consisting of Lak Si and some sub-districts of Chatuchak (Lat Yao,  Sena Nikhom, Chan Kasem) in the general election on March 24, 2019. He was not elected when he lost to Sira Jenjaka Palang Pracharath Party candidate.

In addition to police and politician, Sangprapai is also the owner of the Muaythai gym Wor Sangprapai (ว.สังข์ประไพ), the stable there are many kickboxers who have won both champions of Rajadamnern and Lumpinee Stadiums already such as Phetmorakot Wor Sangprapai  etc. and used to be the chairman of the Nonthaburi F.C. as well.

Royal decorations
Sangprapai has received the following royal decorations in the Honours System of Thailand:
 Knight Grand Cross (First Class) of the Most Noble Order of the Crown of Thailand
 Knight Grand Cross (First Class) of the Most Exalted Order of the White Elephant

References

External links
Official facebook

Sangprapai, Vichai
Sangprapai, Vichai
Vichai Sangprapai
Vichai Sangprapai
Vichai Sangprapai
Vichai Sangprapai
Vichai Sangprapai

th:วิชัย สังข์ประไพ